La Viga's walk (Paseo de la Viga in Spanish) is an oil painting. It was made by Pedro Villegas in 1706 and it is the oldest representation of "La Viga", a Mexico City roadway.

Description 
The roadway "La Viga" was the walk used by the merchants who walked from Chalco and Xochimilco, to then sell their products in the city. The painting shows the arrival of New Spain's viceroy, Francisco Fernández de la Cueva and his wife Juana de la Cerda. They are represented in a boat and they come along with two women. Their social position is emphasized by a cloth structure that covers the couple.

The picture also represents the everyday life of the place: the merchants, the trajineras (Mexican boat), chinampas, guardians, the church, people walking around the place and the volcanos Popocatepetl e Iztaccihuatl.

References 

1706 works
Mexican paintings